LDA may refer to:

Aviation
Localizer type directional aid, an instrument approach to an airport
Landing distance available, the length of runway that is available for the ground run of an airplane landing

Law
Legal document assistant, a non-lawyer authorized to assist with the preparation of legal instruments
Lobbying Disclosure Act of 1995, legislation in the United States
Legal drinking age, the minimum age at which one can legally consume alcohol

Medicine
Left-displaced abomasum, condition of ruminants
Low dose allergens, a variant of enzyme potentiated desensitization

Science and technology
Laser Doppler anemometry, technique to measure velocity
Latent Dirichlet allocation, a generative statistical model
Linear diode array, used for digitizing x-ray images
Linear discriminant analysis, a type of statistical analysis
Lithium diisopropylamide, a strong base in chemistry
Local delivery agent, software that delivers e-mail messages
Local-density approximation, in quantum-mechanical density functional theory
Low density amorphous ice, an amorphous solid form of water
Lobate debris apron, a type of geologic feature observed on Mars

Organizations
Lahore Development Authority, agency in Lahore, Pakistan
Liga Deportiva Alajuelense, a Costa Rican football club
London Democratic Association, 19th century organisation in England
London Development Agency, regional development agency for the London region in England
Lord's Day Alliance, an ecumenical Christian first-day Sabbatarian organization

Other uses
 LDA (singer)
Little Dark Age, a 2018 studio album by MGMT